Joanne Cash (born 28 December 1969) is a media barrister. She was the unsuccessful Conservative Party candidate for Westminster North in the 2010 general election.

Early life and education 
Cash was born in Northern Ireland. Her mother was a newsagent, while her father held various jobs, sometimes up to three at once. She has a brother who is an NHS doctor, and a sister who is a teacher. Cash was educated at Tandragee Primary and Banbridge Academy (both state schools). She read English Literature at Lady Margaret Hall, Oxford University. Cash was elected Librarian of the Oxford Union, but failed in her bid for its presidency.

Legal career 
Cash qualified as a barrister after graduating. She was called to the Bar in 1994 as a member of Gray's Inn, and became a tenant at Farrars' Building. In 2000, she joined One Brick Court to specialise in libel, privacy and freedom of expression work.

In 2005, Cash successfully represented an innocent man dubbed "the lotto rapist" in error by the Sunday Mirror winning her client considerable damages. Cash has spoken out strongly for strengthening freedom of the press, arguing that the Reynolds defence should be strengthened and that the Sullivan defence (derived from the 1964 US case New York Times Co. v. Sullivan, allowing the press to write about public figures) should be introduced to the UK. Cash hosted a debate for Policy Exchange on libel reform, believing that libel tourism ought to be curbed.

Cash has represented a number of clients, including Elle Macpherson and Trudie Styler.

She was called a "freedom fighter" in an Observer article in 2009. For her legal work, the British edition of Vogue includes Cash as one of the 50 women of the age, alongside the likes of Michelle Obama and the Queen.

Conservative candidacy 
As a member of the Society of Conservative Lawyers, Cash assisted the Shadow Cabinet on legal issues. She also worked with Policy Exchange the centre-right think tank to formulate policy proposals and to provide input on media issues, and enlisted governmental support from then Shadow Justice Secretary Dominic Grieve for libel reform. She is a key Tory activist for libel reform and free speech.

In February 2006, she applied to become a Conservative candidate and was placed on the A-list. She was selected to fight her local seat, Westminster North, the first and only seat she had applied for, in November 2006, four months before she met her husband Octavius.

In September 2008, Tatler featured Cash as one of ten top up-and-coming Tories, tipping her as a future Housing Minister. Cash spoke to the magazine about welfare reform, arguing that teenagers need more welfare support for staying in education, not for getting pregnant. Cash was described by The Times in February 2009 as "one to watch". In September 2009, she was profiled in a list of "rising stars" of the Conservative party for The Daily Telegraph, who described her as a "Eurosceptic with a sharp mind". An article in The Sunday Telegraph in October 2009 reported "Some high-profile women are already installed in winnable seats: Louise Bagshawe, Annunziata Rees-Mogg, Priti Patel, Laura Sandys and Joanne Cash will all make colourful additions to the Tory benches."

In February 2010, Cash disagreed with members of her constituency association over strategies to win the seat, with the result that David Cameron, the leader of the party but not yet prime minister, intervened to sack Amanda Sayers, chair of the Westminster North Conservative Association. Cash then commented on her Twitter page that her opponents were "dinosaurs". Shortly afterwards Cash tendered her resignation as candidate, but the Conservatives did not accept it, and she continued to campaign for Westminster North until the election in May.

Cash failed to gain the new seat from the incumbent Labour member for Regent's Park and Kensington North, Karen Buck. When she failed to secure the seat, she accused the media of lying about her and her husband.

Mind Gym 
Fighting an inner London marginal seat inspired Cash to co-found Parent Gym, the philanthropic programme of Mind Gym, which runs workshops aimed at increasing parents' skills and confidence, and therefore improving the wellbeing of their children.

On the back of the success of Parent Gym, Cash became a board director of Mind Gym in 2012 before becoming chair of the board in 2014.

Personal life 
In December 2007, Cash married Octavius Black, the founder and managing director of The Mind Gym. Friends who attended their exchange of vows "included Ed Vaizey and Michael Gove, Viscount and Viscountess Rothermere, Stuart Rose and Kirstie Allsopp". Black was educated at Eton College at the same time as David Cameron; the two men have stayed close, and they and their wives socialise together.

The couple are reported to live in Notting Hill. They have a daughter.

Notes

External links
Website

Members of Gray's Inn
Barristers from Northern Ireland
1969 births
Living people
People from County Armagh
People educated at Banbridge Academy
Alumni of Lady Margaret Hall, Oxford
Women lawyers from Northern Ireland
Conservative Party (UK) parliamentary candidates